Privilege may refer to:

Arts and entertainment
 Privilege (film), a 1967 film directed by Peter Watkins
 Privilege (Ivor Cutler album), 1983
 Privilege (Television Personalities album), 1990
 Privilege (Abridged), an album by Parenthetical Girls, 2013
 "Privilege (Set Me Free)", a 1978 song by the Patti Smith Group
 "Privilege" (Law & Order: Criminal Intent), a television episode
 "Privilege", a short story by Frederick Forsyth included in the collection No Comebacks

Business
 Privilege (insurance company), a division of the Royal Bank of Scotland
 Privilege Ibiza, a nightclub in Ibiza, Spain
 Printing privilege, a precursor of copyright conferring exclusive publishing rights

Society and politics
 Privilege (evidence), rules excluding certain confidential communication from being admissible as evidence in court
 Privilege (canon law)
 Privilege (law), a permission granted by law or other rules
 Executive privilege, the claim by the President of the United States and other executives to immunity from legal process
 Parliamentary privilege
 Social privilege, special status or advantages conferred on certain groups at the expense of other groups, such as:
 White privilege
 Male privilege

Other uses
 Privilege (computing), the level of access granted in computer security
 Privilege Creek, a river in Texas